Nouadhibou Regional Hospital is a regional hospital in Nouadhibou, Mauritania. Construction started in 2012 and the foundation stone was laid by the president of Mauritania Mohamed Ould Abdel Aziz. Financial Help came from the SNIM Foundation  It was opened in 2017 and is staffed with about 50 Cuban Doctors and has 250 in patient beds.

References

External links
Article at www.mauritania.mr

Hospitals in Mauritania
Nouadhibou
Hospitals established in 2017